Beagle Street is an online life insurance company underwritten by Scottish Friendly.  Beagle Street is owned by OneFamily, a financial services provider based in Brighton and Hove, Sussex. OneFamily is a mutual society and as such has no shareholders, and is instead owned by its members.

History
Beagle Street started trading in 2012 by former managing director Matthew Gledhill. The website was designed to let customers take out life insurance in ten minutes. Shortly after its inception, Beagle Street established a help centre in Peterborough.

In 2022, Beagle Street was acquired by OneFamily, a mutual society based in Brighton and Hove. OneFamily CEO Teddy Nyahasha welcomed the deal, stating that "[e]veryone should have access to affordable life cover" and that "OneFamily has been looking for ways to try to help this".

References

External links

Financial services companies established in 2012
Insurance companies of the United Kingdom